"Save Me" (stylized as "Save ME") is a song by South Korean boy group BTS from their compilation album The Most Beautiful Moment In Life: Young Forever (2016). The original Korean version was released by Big Hit on May 2, 2016, in South Korea. The Japanese single version was released on September 7, 2016, on their album Youth, under Universal Music Japan and Virgin Music-Def Jam Recordings.

Music and lyrics 
"Save Me" is a tropical house and electropop track. NMEs Rhian Daly described it as "deceptively bright and bouncy – an aural carnival that masks the pleas for help in the lyrics." The song opens with energetic synth sound that sonically develops towards tropical house sound.  The song contains a speedy rhythm and a "frenetic" chorus. Billboard described it as "powerfully subtle". Lyrically, it deals with the theme of salvation. The song was written by Pdogg, Ray Michael Djan Jr, Ashton Foster, Samantha Harper, RM, Suga, and J-Hope with Pdogg serving as the primary producer. Musically, it is in the key of D♭ major and is 140 beats per minute.

Promotion 
The music video for "Save Me", released in conjunction with the single was produced and directed by GDW. The music video,  which was notably filmed in a one-shot take shows BTS members singing and performing intense choreography against the wind, in the backdrop of low-lying clouds that maximize the atmosphere and convey the emotions of a lyrically sad song. The dance was choreographed by The Quick Style Crew. As of February 2023, the visual has garnered over 700 million views.

BTS decided to promote on music shows only for a week, performing on Mnet, KBS, MBC and SBS as planned to allow for individual activities, performances and overseas schedules, starting with M! Countdown on May 12. The song was promoted at the 2018 MBC Plus X Genie Music Awards performances as well.

Commercial performance 
BTS topped Billboard World Digital Songs with "Save Me", the number 1 spot being taken by their other single "Fire". The videos for "Save Me" ranked second on Most Viewed K-Pop Videos in America, Around the World: May 2016 list revealed by Billboard.

Credits and personnel 
The Korean credits are adapted from the CD liner notes of The Most Beautiful Moment In Life: Young Forever.

Pdogg – producer, keyboard, synthesizer
"Hitman" Bang – producer
Rap Monster – producer
Suga – producer
Devine Channel – producer
Jungkook – chorus
Slow Rabbit – vocal and rap arrangement, recording engineer @ Carrot Express
Sam Klempner – mix engineer

Charts

Certifications and sales

Release history

References 

2016 singles
Korean-language songs
Japanese-language songs
BTS songs
2016 songs
Songs written by RM (rapper)
Songs written by J-Hope
Songs written by Suga (rapper)
Hybe Corporation singles